Artūrs Silagailis (born 3 May 1987) is a retired Latvian football defender. Currently he works as a youth coach at his hometown club Blāzma.

Club career 

Silagailis began his career in the local club Dižvanagi Rēzekne (later renamed SK Blāzma).

In February 2009 he signed a contract with FC Kryvbas Kryvyi Rih. He made his first-team debut in a league match against the famous FC Shakhtar Donetsk.

He found it difficult to find a place in the starting line-up, so he left the team on loan to FK Ventspils in March 2010.

In August 2010 he signed a contract with KF Tirana in Albanian Superliga. Due to the delayed salary payment he left the team in December, the same year, signing a one-year contract with an option to extend it for another season with FC Gomel, playing in the Belarusian Premier League.

Just 3 months after signing with FC Gomel, Silagailis left the club, signing for another Belarusian Premier League club Dnepr Mogilev.

International career 

From 2007 to 2008 Silagailis played for Latvia U-21, but he hasn't been capped for the senior side.

Family 
His brother Guntars is also a professional footballer.

References

External links
 
 
 

1987 births
Living people
People from Rēzekne
Latvian footballers
Association football defenders
Latvian expatriate footballers
Expatriate footballers in Ukraine
Latvian expatriate sportspeople in Ukraine
Expatriate footballers in Albania
Expatriate footballers in Belarus
Ukrainian Premier League players
SK Blāzma players
FC Kryvbas Kryvyi Rih players
FK Ventspils players
KF Tirana players
FC Gomel players
FC Dnepr Mogilev players